Mimas may refer to:

Mimas (Giant), son of Gaia in Greek mythology, one of the Gigantes
Mimas (Aeneid), a son of Amycus and Theono, born the same night as Paris, who escorted Aeneas to Italy
Karaburun, a town and district in Turkey, formerly called Mimas in reference to the Giant
Mimas (moon), in astronomy, a moon of Saturn marked by a giant crater on its surface
Mimas (moth), a genus of hawk moths
Mimas (data centre), a UK national academic data centre at the University of Manchester
 Mimas, a centaur mentioned in the archaic Greek epic poem, the Shield of Heracles, at line 182
 Mimas, grandfather of Aeolus, the keeper of the winds in Homer's Odyssey
Pronounced with a final /z/ sound, it may be:
Mima mounds, the unexplained geological formations found on the Mima Prairie, as well as other locations